Nils Mathisen (born 24 January 1959) is a Norwegian jazz musician (keyboards, violin, guitar and bass) and composer, known from significant efforts within cabaret and musicals. Mathisen has released two solo albums, and contributed to releases by Jan Werner, Elisabeth Andreassen, Elg and Arild Nyquist. He is the brother of jazz musicians Per Mathisen (bass), Hans Mathisen (guitar) and Ole Mathisen (saxophone and clarinet).

Career
Born in Sandefjord, Norway, Mathisen was educated Melsomvik Landbruksskole (1981–82) and Horten Ingeniørhøgskole (1984–85). He started as professional musician when he was 15 years old.

In his own Nils Mathisen Band, he played with his brother Hans, and the music in the West Coast Jazz-Rock genre. They released an album on label Mudi, Pop Coast (2007), which had eleven weeks on Norsktoppen.

Discography
Pop Coast (Mudi, 2007)
Do Not Cover (Audiovisjon Records, 2008)

References

External links
Nils Mathisen Official Website

20th-century Norwegian pianists
21st-century Norwegian pianists
Norwegian jazz pianists
Norwegian jazz violinists
Male violinists
Norwegian jazz guitarists
Norwegian jazz composers
Male jazz composers
Musicians from Sandefjord
1969 births
Living people
20th-century guitarists
21st-century Norwegian guitarists
Norwegian male pianists
21st-century violinists
20th-century Norwegian male musicians
21st-century Norwegian male musicians